Dinkar D. Patil (Marathi: दिनकर द. पाटील) (1915–2005) was a prominent Marathi film director, scriptwriter, and dialogue writer during the Golden Era (1950–1990) of the Marathi Film Industry. He directed, wrote scripts and dialogue for more than 60 Marathi films. He also directed two Hindi Films-Mandir and Gharbar. He wrote his famous autobiography titled as Patlache Por.

Early life
Dinkar Patil was born in a Maratha Patil family on 6 November 1915 in the  village of Benadi near Kolhapur. From his childhood he was interested in Marathi stage shows, Marathi plays and cinema. He studied in Kolhapur and completed his B.A. in Literature from Rajaram College in Kolhapur. He was the Editor of college magazine " The Rajaramian". He also used to write articles in the Kirloskar magazine.

Career in films
Dinkar Patil had an illustrious career as a filmmaker for almost five decades from the 1950s to the 1990s. He started his film career doing assistant job in the Maharashtra Film Company owned by Baburao Painter at Kolhapur, and eventually became an assistant director to Master Vinayak and later transitioned into a film director. He directed and wrote scripts for more than 60 Marathi films. He was one of the early filmmakers to realise the importance of the film medium as an instrument of social change and used it successfully to advocate socialism from his films.

Dinkar Patil was a veteran script, dialogue writer and director of Marathi films during Golden era of Marathi cinema. His films depicting rural life with rural themes, he was considered an authority in both script writing and also directing. The script and dialogue of Marathi film with rural theme Jay Malhar were written by Dinkar Patil who later continued in the industry for more than 40 years. He wrote script and dialogue for 62 films and directed 35 films including two Hindi films, Mandir and Gharbar.

Dinkar Patil introduced Marathi Lavani folk dance in his films, which made his films more popular. He was closely related to Jayaprabha and Shalini Studio in Kolhapur. Also, he made valuable efforts in establishing Marathi Film City – Chitranagari in Kolhapur.

UP's and Down's
Patil worked closely with leading film makers and artists such as Master Vinayak, Bhalji Pendharkar, V. Shantaram, Narayan Hari Apte, Lata Mangeshkar, Vekatesh Madgulukar, Chandrakant and Suryakant Mandhare etc. During his long span and career, Patil faced a number of difficulties. Under the burden of a huge loan, he once had to declare insolvency. However, he continued writing and directing films which later gave him both money and reputation. Being inspired by Master Vinayak, the pioneer actor and director in Indian cinema and who was also teacher during Patil's school days, later on Dinkar Patil dedicated himself to the career in Marathi films. He also respected Bhalji Pendharkar as his Guru, particularly in script writing.

Director Dinkar Patil gave Jayshree Gadkar a break in a small role and dance in his Marathi Movie "Disat Tasa Nasat", with Raja Gosavi. This paved her way into mainstream Marathi cinema.

He also directed documentary films for the Government of Maharashtra including Co-operative Parishad held in Pune under chairmanship of Cooperative leader of Maharshtra- Gulabrao Patil, who was his cousin brother.

Literature
Patil wrote scripts for more than 60 films. He used to write about rural and urban life styles in India, which he incorporated into his films. He has written an autobiography named after one of his films Patlache Por in which he has elaborately narrated his career in films and varied experiences in his true life. This famous autobiography titled as Patlache Por was published in 1984 in Marathi. More than 10,000 copies were sold during initial years after publication and now it is translated in many other Indian Languages.

Later life
Despite old age, he completed a film on Maharani Tara Rani (daughter-in-law of Shivaji) and wrote dialogue for the serial on Rajarshi Shahu Maharaja on Shayadri Television, the great social reformer and ruler of the erstwhile Kolhapur Princely state.

He lived in Mumbai for most of his life but returned to Kolhapur with a desire to spend the last years of his life there. Due to attachment to the studios in Kolhapur namely Jayaprabha and Shalini, he reportedly expressed his last desire to immerse his ashes in the premises of the two studios namely Jayaprabha and Shalini Studio in Kolhapur as he was closely attached throughout his life. He died in 2005 at the age of 90 in Kolhapur.

He had three sons and five daughters.

Filmography

List of films directed by Dinkar D. Patil from 1948–1993 in descending order:
Shivrayachi Soon Tararani  1993
Soona Ani Mona 1992
Bhatak Bhavani 1987
Bhamta 1982
Sulakshana 1985
Kunkwacha Tila 1981
Mantryachi Soon 1980
Savat 1980
Sulavarchi Poli 1980
Soonbai Ooti Bharun Jaa 1979
Kunku Maze Bhagyache 1972
Meehi Manoosach Aahe 1971
Kaali Baiko 1970
Courtachi Payri 1970
Dhanya Te Santaji Dhanaji 1968
Suranga Mhantyat Mala 1967
Malhari Martand 1965
Kamapurta Mama 1965
Te Mazhe Gar 1963
Prem Aandhale Aste 1962
Vardakshina 1962
Baap Majha Brahmachari 1962
Majhi Aai 1961
Vardakshina 1960 
Bhairavi 1960
Umaj Padel Tar 1960
shikleli Baiko 1959
Dev Jaaga Aahe 1957
Navra Mhanu Naye Apula 1957
Diste Tasa Naste 1956
Muthbhar Chane 1955
Kuladaivat 1955
Tarka 1954
Gharbaar 1953
May Bahini 1952
Sharada 1951
Patlache Por 1951
Ram Ram Pahune 1950
Mandir 1948 Hindi

References

External links
 List of films directed by Dinkar Patil
 An article on Dinkar D. Patil
 

1915 births
20th-century Indian film directors
Marathi film directors
Indian male screenwriters
Film producers from Karnataka
2005 deaths
People from Belagavi district
Film directors from Karnataka
Screenwriters from Karnataka
20th-century Indian dramatists and playwrights
20th-century Indian male writers
20th-century Indian screenwriters